Saint Louis FC U23 were an American soccer team based in Fenton, Missouri, United States. Founded in 2006, the team played in the Premier Development League (PDL), now USL League Two, the fourth tier of the American Soccer Pyramid, in the Heartland Division of the Central Conference.

The team played its home games at the Cooper Sports Complex, where they had played since 2011. The team's colors are maroon and sky blue. Saint Louis FC purchased the team on May 16, 2016 and renamed Saint Louis FC U23.  Operations were believed to have ceased in 2018, but nothing is known at this point.  They were replaced by a new USL League Two expansion team, the St. Louis Scott Gallagher Soccer Club in 2021.

History
The club was founded as the Springfield Demize out of the ashes of the old Springfield Storm franchise, which had relocated to Glendora, California to become Los Angeles Storm at the end of the 2006 season. The ownership group of the Storm franchise, which included local businessman Doug Fiester and former professional players Chris Hanlon, Armen Tonianse, and Brett Thomas, launched the new team in early 2007, and began play that year.

The club rebranded as Springfield Synergy FC for the 2015 season before its sale to Saint Louis FC in 2016.  The club is no longer active and the last known results of their existence appear at the league's website.

The Springfield Demize have been resurrected as a new semi-professional/amateur franchise in the new Major Arena Soccer League 3 in 2020.  The USL League Two announced a new club to fill the void left by the former club by welcoming the St. Louis Scott Gallagher Soccer Club in 2021.

Players

Current roster

Notable former players
This list of notable former players comprises players who went on to play professional soccer after playing for the team in the Premier Development League, or those who previously played professionally before joining the team.

  Nikola Katic
  Kashif Siddiqi
  Jack Mathis
  Manny Forbes
  Aedan Stanley
  Wan Kuzain Wan Kamal

Year-by-year

Head coaches
  Armen Tonianse (2007-2008)
  Chris Hanlon (2009)
  Logan Hoffman (2010)
  Julio Reyes (2011)
  Chris Hanlon (2012)
  Sean Fraser (2013) 
  Ian Henry (2014) 
  Andrew Bordelon (2015)
  Kevin Stoll (2016–present)

Stadia
 Cooper Sports Complex; Springfield, Missouri (2007-2009, 2011–present)
 Harrison Stadium at Drury University; Springfield, Missouri (2010)

Average attendance
Attendance stats are calculated by averaging each team's self-reported home attendances from the historical match archive at https://web.archive.org/web/20100105175057/http://www.uslsoccer.com/history/index_E.html.

 2007: 224
 2008: 224
 2009: 138
 2010: 193

References

External links
Official Site
Official PDL site

Association football clubs established in 2006
Premier Arena Soccer League teams
USL League Two teams
Soccer clubs in Missouri
2006 establishments in Missouri
Saint Louis FC